A triad is a Chinese transnational organized crime syndicate based in Greater China with outposts in various countries having significant overseas Chinese diaspora populations.

The Hong Kong triad is distinct from mainland Chinese criminal organizations. In ancient China, the triad was one of three major secret societies. It established branches in Macau, Hong Kong, Taiwan, and Chinese communities overseas. Known as "mainland Chinese criminal organizations", they are of two major types: “dark forces” (loosely-organized groups) (）and “Black Societies" (more-mature criminal organizations). Two features which distinguish a black society from ordinary "dark forces" or low-level criminal gangs are the extent to which the organisation is able to control local markets and the degree of police protection able to be obtained. The Hong Kong triad refers to traditional criminal organizations operating in (or originating from) Hong Kong, Macau, Taiwan, and south-east Asian countries and regions, while organized-crime groups in mainland China are known as "mainland Chinese criminal groups".

Etymology

According to the Oxford English Dictionary, "triad" is a translation of the Chinese term Sān Hé Huì 三合會 (Three United Association), referring to the union of heaven, earth, and humanity. Another theory posits that the word "triad" was coined by British officials in colonial Hong Kong as a reference to the triads' use of triangular imagery. It has been speculated that triad organizations took after, or were originally part of, revolutionary movements such as the White Lotus, the Taiping and Boxer Rebellions, and the Heaven and Earth Society.

The generic use of the word "triads" for all Chinese criminal organizations is imprecise; triad groups are geographically, ethnically, culturally, and structurally unique. "Triads" are traditional organized-crime groups originating from Hong Kong, Macau, and Taiwan. Criminal organizations operating in, or originating from, mainland China are "mainland Chinese criminal groups" or "black societies". After years of repression, only some elements of triad groups are involved with illegal activities. Triads in Hong Kong are less involved with "traditional" criminal activity and are becoming associated with white-collar crime; traditional initiation ceremonies rarely take place to avoid official attention.

History

Origins
Triad, a China-based criminal organization, secret association, or club, was a branch of the secret Hung Society, a secret society formed with the intent of overthrowing the then ruling Qing Dynasty. Triads therefore first began as part of an organised patriotic movement to overthrow Qing rule which was considered tyrannical and foreign to the Han ethnic majority since the Qing dynasty was composed of ethnic Manchus. At the turn of the 19th century, Chinese triads were involved in revolutionary and underground activities designed to subvert the ruling ailing Qing which was considered corrupt and unable to reform.

Secret societies in the Qing Dynasty era were synonymous with patriotism, with groups operating under the banner of: "Oppose the Qing Dynasty and Restore Ming". Triads were also allegedly enlisted by the Kuomintang or Nationalist Party during republican era China in order to assassinate political opponents and attack political enemies. Notable organisations included the green gang which participated in the Shanghai massacre of Communist party members in 1927.

After the People's Republic of China was founded in 1949, secret societies in mainland China were suppressed in campaigns ordered by Mao Zedong and subsequently by Deng Xiaoping during the "Strike Hard" campaigns against organised crime in 1978. As a result, most Chinese secret societies, including the triads and some of the remaining Ching Gang (a group which splintered from the originally fragmented Hung Society), relocated to the British colony of Hong Kong, Taiwan, Southeast Asia, and overseas countries (particularly the United States) and competed with the Tong and other ethnic Chinese criminal organisations. Gradually, Chinese secret societies turned to drugs and extortion for income.

18th century
The Heaven and Earth Society (天地會, Tiandihui), a fraternal organization, was founded during the 1760s, possibly either in 1760 or 1769. As the society's influence spread throughout China, it branched into several smaller groups with different names, one of which was the Three Harmonies Society (三合會, Sānhéhuì). These societies adopted the triangle as their emblem, usually accompanied by decorative images of swords or portraits of Guan Yu (关羽, Guān Yǔ) (the Chinese god of war).

19th century
Such societies were seen as legitimate ways of helping immigrants from China settle into their new place of residence and through employment and development of local connections. Secret societies were banned by the British colonial government in Singapore during the 1890s, and were slowly reduced in number by successive colonial governors and leaders. Rackets which facilitated the economic power of Singapore triads, the opium trade and prostitution, were also banned. Immigrants were encouraged to seek help from a local kongsi instead of turning to secret societies, which contributed to the societies' decline. During the incredibly bloody Taiping Rebellion, many either decided or were forced to aid the Taiping Heavenly Kingdom out of opposition to the interfering Qing Dynasty.

20th century

After the Second World War, the secret societies saw a resurgence as gangsters took advantage of the uncertainty to re-establish themselves. Some Chinese communities, such as "new villages" in Kuala Lumpur and Bukit Ho Swee in Singapore, became notorious for gang violence. When the Chinese Communist Party came to power in 1949 in mainland China, law enforcement became stricter and a government crackdown on criminal organizations forced the triads to migrate to British Hong Kong. An estimated 300,000 triad members lived in Hong Kong during the 1950s. According to the University of Hong Kong, most triad societies were established between 1914 and 1939 and there were once more than 300 in the territory. The number of groups has consolidated to about 50, of which 14 are under police surveillance. There were nine main triads—Wo Hop To, Wo Shing Wo, Rung, Tung, Chuen, Shing, Sun Yee On, 14K, and Luen—operating in Hong Kong. They divided land by ethnic group and geographic locations, with each triad in charge of a region. Each had their own headquarters, sub-societies, and public image. After the 1956 riots, the Hong Kong government introduced stricter law enforcement and the triads became less active.

21st century
On 18 January 2018, Italian police arrested 33 people connected to a Chinese triad operating in Europe as part of its Operation China Truck (which began in 2011). The triad were active in Tuscany, Veneto, Rome, and Milan in Italy, and in France, Spain, and the German city of Neuss. The indictment accused the Chinese triad of extortion, usury, illegal gambling, prostitution, and drug trafficking. The group was said to have infiltrated the transport sector, using intimidation and violence against Chinese companies wishing to transport goods by road into Europe. Police seized several vehicles, businesses, properties, and bank accounts.

According to the expert in terrorist organizations and mafia-type organized crime, Antonio De Bonis, there is a close relationship between the Triads and the Camorra, and the port of Naples is the most important landing point of the trades managed by the Chinese in cooperation with the Camorra. Among the illegal activities in which the two criminal organizations work together are human trafficking and illegal immigration aimed at the sexual and labor exploitation of Chinese immigrants into Italy, as well as synthetic drug trafficking and the laundering of illicit money through the purchase of real estate. In 2017, investigators discovered an illicit industrial waste transportation scheme jointly run by the Camorra and Triads. The waste was transported from Italy to China, leaving from Prato in Italy and arriving in Hong Kong- a scheme which, prior to its discovery, had been netting millions of dollars' worth of revenue for both organizations.

Criminal activities
Triads engage in a variety of crimes, from fraud, extortion, and money laundering to trafficking and prostitution, and are involved in smuggling and counterfeiting goods such as music, video, software, clothes, watches, and money.

Drug trafficking
Since the first opium bans during the 19th century, Chinese criminal gangs have been involved in worldwide illegal drug trade. Many triads switched from opium to heroin, produced from opium plants in the Golden Triangle, refined into heroin in China, and trafficked to North America and Europe, in the 1960s and 1970s. The most important triads active in the international heroin trade are the 14K and the Tai Huen Chai. Triads have begun smuggling chemicals from Chinese factories to North America (for the production of methamphetamine), and to Europe for the production of MDMA. Triads in the United States also traffic large quantities of ketamine.

Counterfeiting
Triads have been engaging in counterfeiting since the 1880s. During the 1960s and 1970s, they were involved in counterfeiting currency (often the Hong Kong 50-cent piece). The gangs were also involved in counterfeiting expensive books for sale on the black market. With the advent of new technology and the improvement of the average standard of living, triads produce counterfeit goods such as watches, film VCDs and DVDs, and designer apparel such as clothing and handbags. Since the 1970s, triad turf control was weakened and some shifted their revenue streams to legitimate businesses.

Health care fraud
In 2012, four triad members were arrested for health care fraud in Japan.

Structure and composition

Triads use numeric codes to distinguish ranks and positions within the gang; the numbers are inspired by Chinese numerology and are based on the I Ching.<ref>Stephen L. Mallory, Understanding Organized Crime (Jones & Bartlett Learning, 2007), page 137</ref> The Mountain (or Dragon Master Head) is 489, 438 is the Deputy Mountain Master, 432 indicates Straw Sandal rank; the Mountain Master's proxy, Incense Master (who oversees inductions into the triad), and Vanguard are 438 or 2238 (who assists the Incense Master). Law enforcement and intel have it that the Vanguard may actually hold the highest power or final word. A military commander (also known as a Red Pole), overseeing defensive and offensive operations, is 426; 49 denotes a soldier, or rank-and-file member. The White Paper Fan (415) provides financial and business advice, and the Straw Sandal (432) is a liaison between units.Secret Societies, page 167 An undercover law-enforcement agent or spy from another triad is 25, also popular Hong Kong slang for an informant. Blue Lanterns are uninitiated members, equivalent to Mafia associates, and do not have a designating number. According to De Leon Petta Gomes da Costa, who interviewed triads and authorities in Hong Kong, most of the current structure is a vague, low hierarchy. The traditional ranks and positions no longer exist.

Rituals and codes of conduct
Similar to the Indian thuggees or the Japanese yakuza, triad members participate in initiation ceremonies. A typical ceremony takes place at an altar dedicated to Guan Yu (關羽, GuānYǔ), with incense and an animal sacrifice (usually a chicken, pig, or goat). After drinking a mixture of wine and blood (from the animal or the candidate), the member passes beneath an arch of swords while reciting the triad's oaths. The paper on which the oaths are written will be burnt on the altar to confirm the member's obligation to perform his duties to the gods. Three fingers of the left hand are raised as a binding gesture. The triad initiate is required to adhere to 36 oaths.

Clans

Based in Hong Kong
The most powerful triads based in Hong Kong are:
 14K
 Sun Yee On
 Tai Huen Chai
 Wo Shing Wo
 Shui Fong
 Wo Hop To
 Luen Group
 Turonngo Seto Group

Based elsewhere
Many triads emigrated to Taiwan and Chinese communities worldwide:

 Bamboo Union, Taiwan
 Four Seas Gang, Taiwan
 Tien Tao Meng, Taiwan
 Song Lian Gang, Taiwan
 Lo Fu-chu, Taiwan
 Sio Sam Ong, Malaysia
 Ang Soon Tong, Singapore 
 Wah Kee, Singapore 
 Ghee Hin Kongsi, Singapore 
 Ping On, Boston
 Wah Ching, San Francisco
 Black Dragons, Los Angeles
 Flying Dragons, New York City
 Ghost Shadows, New York City
 Green Dragons, New York City
 White Tigers, New York City
 Ah Kong, Amsterdam, Bangkok
 Black Jade, Texas
 The Company, Australia, Macau 

Tongs

Similar to triads, Tongs originated independently in early immigrant Chinatown communities. The word means "social club", and tongs are not specifically underground organizations. The first tongs formed during the second half of the 19th century among marginalized members of early immigrant Chinese-American communities for mutual support and protection from nativists. Modeled on triads, they were established without clear political motives and became involved in criminal activities such as extortion, illegal gambling, drug and human trafficking, murder, and prostitution.Andrew Sekeres III, Institutionalization of the Chinese Tongs in Chicago's Chinatown  (accessed June 26, 2011)

Southeast Asia

Triads were also active in Chinese communities throughout Southeast Asia. When Malaysia and Singapore (with the region's largest population of ethnic Chinese) became crown colonies, secret societies and triads controlled local communities by extorting protection money and illegal money lending. Many conducted blood rituals, such as drinking one another's blood, as a sign of brotherhood; others ran opium dens and brothels.

Remnants of these former gangs and societies still exist. Due to government efforts in Malaysia and Singapore to reduce crime, the societies have largely faded from the public eye (particularly in Singapore).

Triads were also common in Vietnamese cities with large Chinese (especially Cantonese and Teochew) communities. During the French colonial period, many businesses and wealthy residents in Saigon (particularly in the Chinatown district) and Haiphong were controlled by protection-racket gangs.

With Vietnamese independence in 1945, organized crime activity was drastically reduced as Ho Chi Minh's government purged criminal activity in the country. According to Ho, abolishing crime was a method of protecting Vietnam and its people. During the First Indochina War, Ho's police forces concentrated on protecting people in his zone from crime; the French cooperated with criminal organisations to fight the Viet Minh. In 1955, President Ngô Đình Diệm ordered the South Vietnamese military to disarm and imprison organized-crime groups in the Saigon-Gia Định-Biên Hòa-Vũng Tàu region and cities such as Mỹ Tho and Cần Thơ in the Mekong Delta. Diem banned brothels, massage parlours, casinos and gambling houses, opium dens, bars, drug houses, and nightclubs, all establishments frequented by the triads. However, Diệm allowed criminal activity to finance his attempts to eliminate the Viet Minh in the south. Law enforcement was stricter in the north, with stringent control and monitoring of criminal activities. The government of the Democratic Republic of Vietnam purged and imprisoned organized criminals, including triads, in the Haiphong and Hanoi areas. With pressure from Ho Chi Minh's police, Triad affiliates had to choose between elimination or legality. During the Vietnam War, the triads were eliminated in the north; in the south, Republic of Vietnam corruption protected their illegal activities and allowed them to control US aid. During the 1970s and 1980s, all illegal Sino-Vietnamese activities were eliminated by the Vietnamese police. Most triads were compelled to flee to Taiwan, Hong Kong, or other countries in Southeast Asia.

International activities
Triads are also active in other regions with significant overseas-Chinese populations: Macau, Taiwan, Hong Kong, the United States, Canada, Japan, Australia, the United Kingdom, Germany, France, Italy, Brazil, Peru, and Argentina. They are often involved in migrant smuggling. Shanty and Mishra (2007) estimate that the annual profit from narcotics is $200 billion, and annual revenues from human trafficking into Europe and the United States are believed to amount to $3.5 billion.

In Australia, the major importer of illicit drugs in recent decades has been 'The Company', according to police sources in the region. This is a conglomerate run by triad bosses which focuses particularly on methamphetamine and cocaine. It has laundered money through junkets for high-stakes gamblers who visit Crown Casinos in Australia and Macau. 

 Chinese government connections 

Due to their history of "patriotic" work in support of various political movements and factions, triads are alleged to be connected to the Chinese government; specifically, the Chinese Communist Party both at local and mid-to central levels. Triad members are alleged to be members acting as agents of the state in achieving its political objectives of suppressing dissent, quelling protests and silencing, intimidating, and coercing critics both at home and abroad, particularly in Hong Kong, Taiwan, and countries with high concentrations of ethnic Chinese diasapora. This is demonstrated through the alleged involvement of triads in the Yuen Long attack against pro-democracy protestors in Hong Kong in 2019. Hong Kong police were subsequently accused of collusion with triad criminal syndicates due to the notable absence of officers at the time of the scene despite heavy police presence at protest events in weeks prior. The activities of triads are enabled by both local government corruption and law enforcement authorities who turn a blind eye to criminal behavior when influenced by the seniority of corrupt officials out of political convenience.

Countermeasures
Law enforcement
Hong Kong
The Organized Crime and Triad Bureau (OCTB) is the division of the Hong Kong Police Force responsible for triad countermeasures. The OCTB and the Criminal Intelligence Bureau work with the Narcotics and Commercial Crime Bureaus to process information to counter triad leaders. Other involved departments include the Customs and Excise Department, the Immigration Department, and the Independent Commission Against Corruption. They cooperate with the police to impede the expansion of triads and other organized gangs. Police actions regularly target organised crime, including raids on triad-controlled entertainment establishments and undercover work. The journal Foreign Policy reported in its August 2019 edition, alleged triad involvement in repressing the Hong Kong protests.

Canada

At the national (and, in some cases, provincial) level, the Royal Canadian Mounted Police's Organized Crime Branch is responsible for investigating gang-related activities (including triads). The Canada Border Services Agency Organized Crime Unit works with the RCMP to detain and remove non-Canadian triad members. Asian gangs are found in many cities, primarily Toronto, Vancouver, Calgary, and Edmonton.

The Guns and Gangs Unit of the Toronto Police Service is responsible for handling triads in the city. The Asian Gang Unit of the Metro Toronto Police was formerly responsible for dealing with triad-related matters, but a larger unit was created to deal with the broad array of ethnic gangs.

The Organized Crime and Law Enforcement Act provides a tool for police forces in Canada to handle organized criminal activity. The act enhances the general role of the Criminal Code (with amendments to deal with organized crime) in dealing with criminal triad activities. Asian organized-crime groups were ranked the fourth-greatest organized-crime problem in Canada, behind outlaw motorcycle clubs, aboriginal crime groups, and Indo-Canadian crime groups.

In 2011, it was estimated that criminal gangs associated with triads controlled 90 percent of the heroin trade in Vancouver, British Columbia. Due to its geographic and demographic characteristics, Vancouver is the point of entry into North America for much of the heroin produced in Southeast Asia (much of the trade controlled by international organized-crime groups associated with triads). From 2006 to 2014, Southeast, East and South Asians accounted for 21 percent of gang deaths in British Columbia (trailing only Caucasians, who made up 46.3 percent of gang deaths).

Australia

In June 2022, commissioner of the Australian Federal Police, Reece Kershaw, stated at the Five Eyes law enforcement group (FVLEG) that foreign governments were collaborating with criminal syndicates in the West and that: "state actors and citizens from some nations are using our countries at the expense of our sovereignty and economies". While no country was mentioned in particular, China was notably included, with the implication of involvement of Chinese organised crime in Australia.

In August 2022, reporting by the Australian Broadcasting Corporation revealed that Hong Kong-based jewelry and real estate development conglomerate Chow Tai Fook was endorsed by the Queensland state government as a 25% shareholder in The Star casino's Queen's wharf development.

The Chow Fook Tai conglomerate is owned by Cheng Yu Teng who was believed to have affiliations with the 14K triad and was alleged to have connections with Hong Kong and Macau organised crime syndicates, specifically through business connections with Wan Kuok Kui, "Broken Tooth", or "Broken Tooth Koi" in triad circles.

The 14K, Sun Yee On triads were believed to have been closely affiliated with Cheng and used as enforcers for the collection of gambling debts, in addition to being engaged in prostitution, human, and drug trafficking. Kui has been the subject of sanctions by the United States Department of Treasury under the Global Magnitsky Act for corruption, embezzlement, and "misappropriation of state assets" as of 2020.

Legislation
Primary laws addressing triads are the Societies Ordinance and the Organized and Serious Crimes Ordinance. The former, enacted in 1949 to outlaw triads in Hong Kong, stipulates that any person convicted of being (or claiming to be) an officeholder or managing (or assisting in the management) of a triad can be fined up to HK$1 million and imprisoned for up to 15 years.

The power of triads has also diminished due to the 1974 establishment of the Independent Commission Against Corruption. The commission targeted corruption in police departments linked with triads.
Being a member of a triad is an offence punishable by fines ranging from HK$100,000 to HK$250,000 and three to seven years imprisonment under an ordinance enacted in Hong Kong in 1994, which aims to provide police with special investigative powers, provide heavier penalties for organized-crime activities, and authorize the courts to confiscate the proceeds of such crimes.

Notable members
 Chan Cheong Kit
 Chee Kok Loong
 Wong Lun Fat
 Mark Ho
 Murali Shunmugam
 Chaiyanat “Tuhao” Kornchayanant (a powerful Thai-Chinese businessman and crime boss who is accused of leading a Chinese mafia group in Bangkok, Thailand).Bangkok Post: Officials squirm amid Chuvit's Triad exposé
 Qi Guang Guo (a notorious Chinese Australian crime boss, known for being a high-ranking leader of the Big Circle Gang in Australia)The Sydney Morning Herald: Alleged Triad boss Qi Guang Guo wins $35,001 for unlawful detention
 Xie Caiping (one of the most notorious female criminals to be a high-ranking member within the triads; she is the most powerful criminal in Chongqing and is known by her nickname, "Godmother of the underworld". She was one of the convicted criminals in the Chongqing gang trials)CBS News: Chinese "Godmother" Sentenced to 18 Years
 "Fei Kai" (former leader of Wo On Lok)
 Kwok "Shanghai Tsai/Shanghai Boy" Wing-hung (Wo Shing Wo's most notorious dragonhead)South China Morning Post: Alleged triad gangster arrested upon return to Hong Kong after years on the run
 Cheung "Inch Brother" Chung-wing (former leader of Wo Shing Wo)
 Wan Kuok-koi (former leader of Macau branch of 14K triad)
 Raymond "Shrimp Boy" Chow (former leader of the U.S. branch of Wo Hop To)
 Peter "Uncle" Chong (former leader of U.S. branch of Wo Hop To)
 Chen Chi-li (former leader of Bamboo Union, Taiwan's largest Triad group)
 Michael Chan (Hong Kong actor and martial artist, No. 2 of the Tsim Sha Tsui branch of the 14K triad)
 Stephen "Sky Dragon" Tse (founder and leader of Ping On, a notorious Chinese American triad group)
 Tse Chi Lop (Chinese Canadian kingpin, leader of Sam Gor, a powerful Asia-Pacific triad syndicate and former member of the Big Circle Gang)
 John "Bac Guai John/White Devil John" Willis (The only white person to be a high-ranking member of a Triad group; in this case, a high-ranking member of Ping On).

See also

 List of Chinese criminal organizations
 List of criminal enterprises, gangs and syndicates
 Organized crime
 Organised crime in Hong Kong
 Triads in the United Kingdom
 Secret societies in Singapore
 Tongs
 Chongqing gang trials
 Hong Kong action cinema:
 Gun fu
 Heroic bloodshed
 Sicilian Mafia
 Snakeheads (Chinese human-trafficking groups)
 Tiandihui
 Xiantiandao
 White Lotus
 Russian mafia
 Yakuza
 Sio Sam Ong
 Wan Kuok-koi
 Criminal tattoos
 Social problems in Chinatown
 Thuggee
 Sembilan Naga in Indonesia

 Citations 

 General and cited references 
 Books (Triad societies)
 
 
 
 
 
 

 Books (Black societies or criminal organizations in mainland China)
 Wang, Peng (2017). The Chinese Mafia: Organized Crime, Corruption, and Extra-Legal Protection. Oxford: Oxford University Press. .

 News
 Gertz, Bill; "Organized-crime triads targeted", The Washington Times (Friday, April 30, 2010). Retrieved 10 June 2013.
 Wong, Natalie; "Dragons smell blood again", The Standard (January 21, 2011). Retrieved 10 June 2013.

 Government publication
 

 Video'
 "Gangland- Deadly Triangle". Online video clip. YouTube, 2008. Web. Accessed 21 April 2016.

Further reading

 Books
 Lintner, Bertil (2014). Blood Brothers: The Criminal Underworld of Asia. Allen & Unwin.

 Journal articles
 Lo, T. Wing. "Beyond Social Capital: Triad Organized Crime in Hong Kong and China". British Journal of Criminology 50.5 (2010): 851–872. .
 Purbrick, Martin. "Patriotic Chinese Triads and Secret Societies: From the Imperial Dynasties, to Nationalism, and Communism". Asian Affairs Journal, issue 3, volume 50, (2019) 305-322 (open access). .
 Skarbek, D., & Wang, P. (2015). "Criminal Rituals". Global Crime, 16(4), 288–305. .
 Wang, Peng. "The Increasing Threat of Chinese Organised Crime: National, Regional and International Perspectives". The RUSI Journal''. Vol. 158, No. 4, (2013),pp. 6–18. .

Chinese secret societies
Organized crime groups in Brazil
Organized crime groups in China
Organised crime groups in Hong Kong
Organized crime groups in Macau
Organized crime groups in Taiwan
Secret societies related to organized crime
Transnational organized crime
 
Criminal subcultures
Crime in China